Year 1517 (MDXVII) was a common year starting on Thursday (link will display the full calendar) of the Julian calendar.

Events 
 January–June 
 January 22 – Battle of Ridaniya: The Holy Ottoman army of the sultan Selim I defeat the Mamluk army in Egypt, under Tuman bay II.
 February 3 – Cairo is captured by the Ottoman Empire, and the Mamluk Sultanate falls.
 March 16 – The Fifth Council of the Lateran ends.
 May 1 – Evil May Day: Xenophobic riots break out in London.

 July–December 
 August 15 – Portuguese merchant Fernão Pires de Andrade meets Ming Dynasty Chinese officials through an interpreter, at the Pearl River estuary and lands, at what is now in the jurisdiction of Hong Kong. Although the first European trade expeditions to China took place in 1513 and 1516 by Jorge Álvares and Rafael Perestrello, respectively, Andrade's mission is the first official diplomatic mission of a European power to China, commissioned by a ruler of Europe (Manuel I of Portugal).
 October 31 — Reformation: Martin Luther publishes his 95 Theses (posting them on the door of the Wittenberg Castle Church). This story is possibly apocryphal. 

 Date unknown 
 Grand Prince Vasili III of Muscovy conquers Ryazan.
 A third outbreak of the sweating sickness in England hits Oxford and Cambridge.
 The Abbasid Caliphate of Cairo, reestablished in 1261, falls to the Ottomans.

Births 

 January 17
 Henry Grey, 1st Duke of Suffolk, English duke (d. 1554)
 Antonio Scandello, Italian composer (d. 1580)
 January 30 – Joannes Aurifaber Vratislaviensis, German theologian (d. 1568)
 February 2 – Gotthard Kettler, Duke of Courland and Semigallia (d. 1587)
 February 12 – Luigi Cornaro, Italian Catholic cardinal (d. 1584)
 March 22 – Gioseffo Zarlino, Italian composer (d. 1590)
 March 29 – Carlo Carafa, Italian Catholic cardinal (d. 1561)
 May 1 – Svante Stensson Sture, Swedish count (d. 1567)
 June 18 – Emperor Ōgimachi, Japanese emperor (d. 1593)
 June 29 – Rembert Dodoens, Flemish botanist (d. 1585)
 July 10 – Odet de Coligny, French cardinal and Protestant  (d. 1571)
 July 16 – Frances Grey, Duchess of Suffolk, English duchess (d. 1559)
 July 20 – Peter Ernst I von Mansfeld-Vorderort, Governor of the Habsburg Netherlands (d. 1604)
 August 20 – Antoine Perrenot de Granvelle, statesman, French Catholic cardinal (d. 1586)
 August 23 – Francis I, Duke of Lorraine (d. 1545)
 September 6 – Francisco de Holanda, Portuguese artist (d. 1585)
 October 17 – Amalia of Cleves, German princess and writer (d. 1586)
 October 18 – Manuel da Nóbrega, Spanish Catholic priest (d. 1570)
 December 15 – Giacomo Gaggini, Italian artist (d. 1598)
 approx. date – Isabella Parasole, Italian artist (d. ca. 1620)
 date unknown
Jacques Pelletier du Mans, French mathematician (d. 1582)
Hayashi Narinaga, Japanese samurai (d. 1605)
Henry Howard, Earl of Surrey, English aristocrat (d. 1547)

Deaths 

 January 5 – Francesco Raibolini, Italian painter (b. c. 1450)
 January 9 – Joanna of Aragon, Queen of Naples (b. 1454)
 January 22 – Hadım Sinan Pasha, Ottoman grand vizier (b. 1459)
 March 7 – Maria of Aragon, Queen of Portugal (b. 1482)
 March 26 – Heinrich Isaac, Flemish composer (b. c. 1450)
 April 15 – Tuman bay II, last Mamluk sultan of Egypt (b. c. 1476)
 June 19 – Luca Pacioli, Mathematician, collaborator with Leonardo da Vinci and 'father of accounting' (b. c. 1447)
 September 21 – Dyveke Sigbritsdatter, mistress of Christian II of Denmark (b. 1490)
 September 24 – Frederick IV of Baden, Dutch bishop (b. 1455)
 October 31 – Fra Bartolomeo, Italian artist (b. 1472)
 November 6 – Wiguleus Fröschl of Marzoll, Bishop of Passau (1500–1517) (b. 1445)
 November 8 – Francisco Jiménez de Cisneros, Spanish Catholic cardinal and statesman (b. 1436)
 date unknown
 Badi' al-Zaman, Timurid ruler of Herat
 Francisco Hernández de Córdoba, Spanish conquistador
 Marcus Musurus, Greek scholar and philosopher (b. 1470)
 probable
 Gaspar van Weerbeke, Dutch composer (b. 1445)

References